Nicolae Cajal (October 1, 1919, in Bucharest – March 7, 2004) was a Romanian Jewish physician, academic, politician, and philanthropist. He was President of the Jewish Communities' Federation of Romania from 1994 to his death.

Biography
Cajal held a Ph.D. degree in virology and chaired the Ștefan S. Nicolau Virology Research Center in Bucharest for years. He was a Member of the Romanian Academy, the Romanian Medical Sciences Academy, the British Royal Society of Medicine, and the New York Academy of Sciences. From 1966, he was an expert for the World Health Organization. In 1944, Cajal worked as an intern in the hospital laboratories, in the laboratories of the bacteriology department of the Medical Faculty of Bucharest, and since 1945 at the department of inframicrobiology - virusology.

As a specialist in virology, Cajal was a disciple of Ștefan S. Nicolau, founder of the Romanian School of Virology. His contributions were published in over 400 scientific papers.

In 1966, Cajal became a professor and head of the virology department at the Institute of Medicine and Pharmacy of Bucharest, having passed through all the didactic degrees, being, in turn, through the competition, trainer, assistant, head of works, lecturer. Starting in 1967, Cajal was the director of the Institute of Virusology of the Romanian Academy.

Cajal was an active member in civil society, involved in improving awareness of war crimes carried in World War II Romania and of the genocide in Transnistria and other occupied areas (see Romania during World War II).

Between 1990 and 1992, he was a senator for Bucharest, representing the National Salvation Front, the new moderate-Socialist government party after the Romanian Revolution. In his parliamentary activity, Cajal was a member of the parliamentary groups of friendship with the People's Republic of China, the State of Israel,  and with the French Senate.

He was elected correspondent member in 1963 and in 1990 a full member of the Romanian Academy. He was vice-president of the Romanian Academy (1990-1994), president of the Medical Sciences Section and president of the M. H. Elias Foundation. He was a member of the New York Academy of Sciences and Doctor Honoris Causa of the Universities of Oradea (1994), Timișoara (1995), Cluj-Napoca (1995), and Iași (1996).

References

External links
Outdated bio at the Romanian Parliament site

1919 births
2004 deaths
Physicians from Bucharest
Grand Officers of the Order of the Star of Romania
Titular members of the Romanian Academy
Politicians from Bucharest
Romanian Sephardi Jews
Romanian philanthropists
Romanian virologists
Members of the Senate of Romania
20th-century philanthropists
National Salvation Front (Romania) politicians
Academic staff of the Carol Davila University of Medicine and Pharmacy